Tritia tinei is a species of sea snail, a marine gastropod mollusc in the family Nassariidae, the nassa mud snails or dog whelks.

Description
The length of the shell varies between 7 mm and 12 mm.

Distribution
This species occurs in the Mediterranean Sea.

References

 Cernohorsky W. O. (1984). Systematics of the family Nassariidae (Mollusca: Gastropoda). Bulletin of the Auckland Institute and Museum 14: 1–356
 Gofas, S.; Le Renard, J.; Bouchet, P. (2001). Mollusca, in: Costello, M.J. et al. (Ed.) (2001). European register of marine species: a check-list of the marine species in Europe and a bibliography of guides to their identification. Collection Patrimoines Naturels, 50: pp. 180–213

External links
 Maravigna C. (1840). G. Buccin. Buccinum. Lamarck. B. de Tineo. B. Tinei. Maravigna. Magasin de Zoologie, d'Anatomie Comparée et de Palaeontologie. (2) 2, pl. 24
 Calcara P., 1845: Cenno sui molluschi viventi e fossili della Sicilia da servire da supplimento ed insieme di critiche osservazioni all'opera di R.A. Philippi  Stamperia Reale, Palermo 49 p., 4 pl
 Galindo, L. A.; Puillandre, N.; Utge, J.; Lozouet, P.; Bouchet, P. (2016). The phylogeny and systematics of the Nassariidae revisited (Gastropoda, Buccinoidea). Molecular Phylogenetics and Evolution. 99: 337-353
 

Nassariidae
Gastropods described in 1840